Normanhurst Boys' High School (colloquially known as Normo) is an academically selective secondary day school for boys, located in the suburb of , on the Upper North Shore of Sydney, New South Wales, Australia. Consistently ranked as one of the nation's top schools academically, it was ranked seventh in the state based on NSW Higher School Certificate (HSC) results in 2020.

Established in 1958, the school caters for approximately 730 students from Year 7 to Year 12, who are accepted on an academic basis. Based on entry standards, it is one of the top ten schools in New South Wales. The school celebrated its 60th anniversary in 2018.

History
In 1957, five schools made up the Hornsby school site, located on the Pacific Highway: a boys' primary school and a boys' junior technical school on the eastern side, and an infants school, a girls’ primary school, and a girls’ domestic science school on the western side. On 30 November 1957, the three western schools were destroyed by bushfires. Over the 1957-58 Christmas holidays, the three schools were relocated into the facilities of the boys' technical school, and the three year groups of boys were moved to a newly built but unopened school at Normanhurst.

From its opening in 1958 until 1993, Normanhurst Boys' High School operated as a comprehensive school. In 1993, the Government of New South Wales marked Normanhurst as one of several high schools allowed to select students by academic achievement. The first intake of "selective" students was made up of those starting Year Seven in 1994, with a new intake of Year Sevens each year, until the school became fully selective in 1999. Presently, Normanhurst is one of seventeen fully selective schools in New South Wales.

Academics
Like other academically selective schools, Normanhurst is known for its high academic achievement in the Higher School Certificate. The following table shows the school's rankings relative to other schools in the state. The rankings are based on the percentage of exams sat that resulted in a placing on the Distinguished Achievers List (highest band result) as shown by the Board of Studies, Teaching and Educational Standards (BOSTES NSW).

In 2010, the school was ranked 14th in the state.

Demographics
The school's students are one of the most socio-economically advantaged in NSW, in terms of the Index of Community Socio-Educational Advantage score, with 82% of boys at the school from families in the top quarter of society. As a result, the school has been mentioned as part of an ongoing debate about whether Australian selective schools accept enough students from less well-off families, and if selective schools create social inequality.

Structure
Normanhurst Boys' High School is not far from its "sister" school, Hornsby Girls' High School, with which joint curriculum and extra-curricular activities are held, such as plays and musicals.

Entry
Normanhurst Boys High School is an academically selective high school and accepts a relatively small intake of 120 students in Year 7. It is one of the top ten schools in New South Wales, based on entry standards. Offers of admission and matriculation into the school in Year 7 are made on the basis of academic merit, as assessed by the Selective High School Placement Test, sat in Year 6.

A number of students may be accepted into Years8  through to 11, through direct application to the school and a subsequent internal selection process, consisting of a consideration of character, extracurricular activities and academic ability. An interview is then required before a final offer is made.

Houses
The school has four houses, the names of which are based on figures in the Aboriginal Dreamtime. Pupils compete under their respective house in sport and academics. So far, the most successful house has been Dinewan (blue) as they have won multiple sporting events in the past. The houses are:

Facilities
The school has an area of 6.3 hectares, and is within five minutes walk of Normanhurst railway station. Facilities include a sporting field, four tennis courts and several basketball courts. The campus includes the hall, library, music and drama centre as well as a careers office. There are two gates of entry, one reserved for senior boys and one for junior boys. Each student has a laptop with wireless internet access.

The drama centre was finished in 2017, as part of an extension to the school's main building.

Sport
Normanhurst Boys High School is a member of the North West Metropolitan Sports Association. The sporting year is divided into two seasons, summer and winter, and boys are able to select sports they wish to play throughout the semester. All boys must play sports until Year 11, and are encouraged to play grade sport, representing the school in inter-school competitions. Sports offered include:

Association football (soccer)
Baseball
Badminton
Basketball
Cricket
Futsal
Hockey
Lawn bowls
Oz-tag
Rugby union
Squash
Table tennis
Tennis
Volleyball
Water polo 

The school also holds annual swimming and athletics carnivals, as well as an annual cross-country event.

Co-curricular activities
The school offers numerous clubs and societies to students. These include:
 
Chess club
Creator's club
Debating and public speaking 
Concert band
Environmental society
Jazz ensemble 
Mooting and mock trial
Robotics and programming club
Social justice society
History Club
Filmmaking Club
Stage bands (first and second)
String ensemble
Choir 
Composer's Club

The school participates in the Duke of Edinburgh's Award Scheme, as well as running its own secondary school army cadet unit, 226 Army Cadet Unit. In conjunction with Hornsby Girls High School, a (supposedly annual) musical production is put on, for which boys can audition and participate in. An annual art exhibition is also run by the school.

Normanhurst runs school camps for grades 7–11, notably a camp for Year 7 students to Jenolan Caves and the Central West of New South Wales. The week-long excursion has been running in various forms since 1959. On the camp, boys are accompanied by mentors from senior years. The school also offers overseas cultural trips to London, Paris, Rome and New York.

Normanhurst is also home to a FIRST Robotics Competition team, Team 4739: Ctrl F5, formerly Thunderbolts Robotics, founded in 2010 with their rookie year in 2013, they gained many years experience and was part of the initial 5 Australian teams founded by Team 3132: Thunder Down Under, and the oldest public school team still competing. They have also entered in the FIRST Tech Challenge, gaining first and also won the Duel Down Under in 2019, run by Team 3132.

Motto
The school's motto, Know Thyself, is a Delphic maxim which is attributed to Ancient Greece. The phrase has been expounded by Aeschylus, Socrates and Plato, among others. It is given as nosce te ipsum or temet nosce in Latin.

Principals

The following individuals have served as principals (formerly headmasters) of the school:

Notable alumni
Alumni of Normanhurst Boys' High School are commonly referred to as Old Boys. Some notable Normanhurst Old Boys include:

Business
 David HillChairman and CEO of Fox Sports, creator of the Sky Sports channel, former chairman of Fox Broadcasting

Media, entertainment, and the arts
 Rowan Cahill historian and journalist
 Vince Melouney guitarist, vocalist and songwriter, former member of the Bee Gees.

Medicine and science
 Michael Barber mathematician, physicist, academic
 Jordan Nguyenbiomedical engineer and inventor
 Ian Plimergeologist and academic
 John Shinebiochemist and molecular biologist

Politics, public service, and the law
 Peter Andren former Independent Member for Calare in the Parliament of Australia (1996–2007)
 Peter Baldwinformer Labor Member for Sydney in the Parliament of Australia (1983–1998), former Minister for Employment and Education Services (1990), former Minister for Higher Education and Employment Services (1990–1993), former Minister for Social Security (1993–1996)
 Doug Jones, international arbitrator
 Peter McClellan, Chief Judge in Common Law of the Supreme Court of New South Wales (since 2005), Chief Royal Commissioner of the Royal Commission into Institutional Responses to Child Sexual Abuse

Sport
 David Brown former Australian rules footballer
 Rodger Davisprofessional golfer
 Neil Maxwellformer NSW and Australia A cricketer
 Richard Pybuscricketer and former Pakistan cricket coach
Murray Barnesformer Socceroos captain
 Robert Wheatleyformer Socceroo (1981 to 1990)
 Todd Woodbridgesports broadcaster for Nine Network and former professional tennis player
 Aleksandar Vukicprofessional tennis player

See also

 List of selective high schools in New South Wales
 List of government schools in New South Wales

References

External links

 
 North West Metropolitan Sports Association
 

Educational institutions established in 1958
Boys' schools in New South Wales
Public high schools in Sydney
1958 establishments in Australia
Pacific Highway (Australia)
Selective schools in New South Wales